Gordonbrook Dam is an earthen dam in Gordonbook, South Burnett Region, Queensland, Australia. Along with Boondooma Dam, it is the main source of water supply for Kingaroy in the Wide Bay-Burnett area. It was built in 1941 to provide water for the Royal Australian Air Force Training Base during World War II. In 1987, due to increased demand, the dam wall was raised. From a catchment of 590 square kilometres, the dam stores 6,800 megalitres at full supply level, covering an area of 130 hectares.

Under normal circumstances the town water supply for Kingaroy is a 70:30 blend of water from Boondooma and Gordonbrook Dams, as Gordonbrook Dam water is prone to quality issues such as high levels of algae and bromide.

Recreation

Land 
A basic picnic area is located on the eastern shores. The picnic area is fairly large and contains a composting toilet, a water tank, picnic tables, a boat ramp, information signs and a bush walk that includes an elevated lookout and a well maintained bird hide.

Water 
When the lake area is open to public recreation, the dam provides a good range of water-based activities. The lake is largely accessible to small to medium-sized motorised boats, jetskis, canoes and windcraft. The body provides the best space for water skiing and water tubing, while the foot is best suited for boat fishing and non-motorised craft only, because of the large stands of dead timber.

Fishing 
A Stocked Impoundment Permit is required to fish in all parts of the dam. The dam is stocked with Australian Bass, Golden Perch, Silver Perch, and Saratoga by the Boondooma Dam Fish Stocking and Management Association Inc. Only shore fishing is permitted.

Blue green algae infestation 
During dry periods and because the dam's smaller size, the dam experiences high levels of blue green algae (Cyanobacteria). Activities are at the user's own risk, and the boat ramp has gates to prevent motorised craft from entering the water during times of high risk of the algae.

History
In March 2022, two bodies were found chained together in the dam's waters by a kayaker. It was soon revealed by police to be the bodies of a local couple, 51-year old Daryl Smith and his wife Kirsty Smith.

See also

List of dams and reservoirs in Australia

References

External links
Gordonbrook Dam Recreation Area

Reservoirs in Queensland
Dams completed in 1941
Wide Bay–Burnett
Dams in Queensland
1941 establishments in Australia